Parampara is a succession of teachers and disciples in traditional Indian culture.

Parampara may also refer to:

Parampara (1990 film), a 1990 Malayalam film
Parampara (1993 film), a 1993 Bollywood film
Parampara Thakur, one half of the Sachet–Parampara duo